Snethlage's antpitta (Hylopezus paraensis) is a species of antpitta in the family Grallariidae. It was formerly considered conspecific with the spotted antpitta.

References

Snethlage's antpitta
Birds of the Amazon Basin
Endemic birds of Brazil
Snethlage's antpitta
Snethlage's antpitta